is a junction railway station in the city of Kōriyama, Fukushima Prefecture, Japan operated by East Japan Railway Company (JR East).

Lines

Station layout
The station has a side platform and a single island platform connected to the station building by a footbridge. The station has a  Midori no Madoguchi  staffed ticket office.

Platforms

History
The Suigun Line began operations from May 10, 1929. The station was renamed to its present name on October 30, 1931. The station was absorbed into the JR East network upon the privatization of the Japanese National Railways (JNR) on April 1, 1987.

Passenger statistics
In fiscal 2018, the station was used by an average of 2476 passengers daily (boarding passengers only).

Surrounding area

Abukuma River
 Kōriyama Minami Post Office
 Kōriyama Sasagawa Post Office

See also
 List of Railway Stations in Japan

References

External links

  

Stations of East Japan Railway Company
Railway stations in Fukushima Prefecture
Tōhoku Main Line
Railway stations in Japan opened in 1909
Suigun Line
Kōriyama